Hinduism is a minority religion in Scotland. The bulk of Scottish Hindus settled there in the second half of the 20th century. At the time of the 2001 UK Census, 5,600 people identified as Hindu, which equated to 0.1% of the Scottish population and was slightly above the number of Hindus in Wales. In the 2011 UK Census, the number of Hindus in Scotland almost tripled to over 16,000 adherents.

Demography

Origins
Most Scottish Hindus are of Indian origin, or at least from neighbouring countries, such as Sri Lanka, Pakistan, Nepal and Bangladesh. Many of these came after Idi Amin's expulsion from Uganda in the 1970s, and some also came from South Africa. There are also a few of Indonesian and Afghan origin.

Many of these in turn are from the Punjab region of India. Common languages amongst them, other than English include Punjabi, Hindi, Urdu, Gujarati and Nepali.

Demographics
According to the 2011 census, 16,327 stated their as Hinduism, including 47 Hare Krishnas and 17 Brahma Kumaris.

Temples
There are several Hindu temples across the country. A temple in the West End of Glasgow, opened in 2006. However, it was severely damaged by a fire in May 2010. The ISKCON aka "Hare Krishna" also operates out of Lesmahagow in South Lanarkshire. There are also temples in Edinburgh and Dundee with plans announced in 2008 for a temple in Aberdeen.

See also

Hinduism in the United Kingdom
Hindu Council UK
Hinduism in the Republic of Ireland
Hinduism by country
 British Asian
 Hinduism in Wales
 Hindu eschatology
 Persecution of Hindus

References

External links
Hindutrac in Scotland
Hinduism in Scotland
Thousands heading to city's Hindu celebration
Edinburgh Hindu Mandir & Cultural Centre ( Hindu Temple of Edinburgh)